Never Apologize is a 2007 documentary film of actor Malcolm McDowell's one man show about his experiences working with film director Lindsay Anderson.

On review aggregator website Rotten Tomatoes the film has an approval rating of 67% based on 12 critics, with an average rating of 6/10.

References

External links

2007 films
2007 documentary films
Documentary films about film directors and producers
Concert films